Dinnebitodon is an extinct genus of advanced herbivorous cynodonts of the early Jurassic period.  It has only been found in the Kayenta Formation in northeastern Arizona. It closely resembles the related genus Kayentatherium from the same formation. It is set apart by differences in the dentition, while resembling in most other respects.

Description
Dinnebitodon (meaning "Dinnebito (Wash) tooth"), was a small quadrupedal animal, with a head  in length, belonging to the herbivorous Tritylodontidae family. The description of Dinnebitodon does not give details on the structure of the body other than to say it was similar to Kayentatherium.

Skull and jaw
The majority of the remains so far recovered and assigned to the genus Dinnebitodon are skull and jaw material. There are five postcanine teeth in the upper jaw that would have been functional when Dinnebitodon was alive, with a sixth possibly erupting later in the animal's life. The postcanine teeth resemble rounded-off squares with three rows of cusps on their occlusal surfaces. The teeth are notably different from the other two named Kayenta tritylodonts, Kayentatherium and Oligokyphus.

Habitat
The Kayenta Formation was deposited in an environment of braided rivers and dune fields, similar to northern Senegal today. Dinnebitodon was a terrestrial animal, living in the "Silty Facies" of the Kayenta Formation, which would have represented an interdunal river deposit.  The teeth resemble those of modern animals that also feed on seeds and nuts, suggesting that perhaps Dinnebitodon fed on similar foods present during the early Jurassic Period. Considering it was living alongside its close relative Kayentatherium, some niche partitioning of the resources would have been necessary in order to avoid being outcompeted for a food source. This might explain why two similar looking animals have different dentition.

Fossil finds
Dinnebitodon fossils were first discovered by William Amaral (for whom the species is named) in 1978. Remains are housed at Harvard's Museum of Comparative Zoology and at the Museum of Northern Arizona.

See also

Kayenta Formation
Oligokyphus
Kayentatherium

References

Prehistoric cynodont genera
Jurassic synapsids
Mesozoic synapsids of North America
Kayenta Formation
Tritylodontids
Fossil taxa described in 1986